The Lusatian Mountains are a mountain range of the Western Sudetes on the southeastern border of Germany with the Czech Republic. They are a continuation of the Ore Mountains range west of the Elbe valley. The mountains of the northern, German, part are called the Zittau Mountains.

Geography 

The range is among the westernmost extensions of the Sudetes, which stretch along the border between the historic region of Silesia in the north, and Bohemia and Moravia in the south up to the Moravian Gate in the east, where they join the Carpathian Mountains. The northwestern foothills of the Lusatian Mountains are called the Lusatian Highlands; in the southwest the range borders on the České Středohoří mountains.

The range is largely made up of sandstone sedimentary rocks leaning on a Precambrian crystalline basement. The northern ridge is marked by the Lusatian Fault, a geological disturbance zone separating the Bohemian sandstones from the Lusatian granodiorite. During the Tertiary volcanic magma streams broke through the sandstone layer and solidified into basalt and phonolite. Several sandstone contact areas were also hardened to columns and distinct rock formations.

Mountains and hills 
 

The highest peak is the Lausche (793 m). Other notable peaks include the Pěnkavčí vrch (792m), Jedlová  (774m), Klíč (760m), Hochwald (750m) and Studenec (736m).
 Lausche (Luž), 793 m
 Pěnkavčí vrch (Finkenkoppe), 792 m
 Jedlová (Tannenberg), 774 m
 Klíč (Kleis), 760 m
 Hochwald (Hvozd), 750 m
 Studenec (Kaltenberg), 736 m
 Stožec (Großer Schöber), 665 m
 Jezevčí vrch (Limberg), 665 m
 Malý Stožec (Kleiner Schöber) 659 m
 Zlatý vrch (Goldberg), 657 m
 Chřibský vrch (Himpelberg), 621 m
 Jánské kameny (Johannisstein), 604 m
 Střední vrch (Mittenberg), 593 m
 Sokol (Falkenberg), 592 m
 Töpfer, 582 m
 Popova skála (Pfaffenstein), 565 m
 Ortel (Ortelsberg), 554 m
 Zámecký vrch (Schlossberg), 530 m
 Oybin, 514 m

Protections 
Administratively it is known as the Lusatian Mountains Protected Landscape Area (CHKO Lužické hory) and has the status of CHKO, a so-called Landscape park. The smaller German part of the mountains also became a nature protection in 2008, when the Zittau Mountain Nature Park was established, with the effect that the entire Lusatian Mountains is now under some form of nature protection.

See also 
 List of regions of Saxony
 Lusatian Highlands
 Bohemian track

References

External links 

 Czech site
 Photos of the Lusatian Mountains

 
Sudetes
Mountain ranges of the Czech Republic
Regions of Saxony
Mountain ranges of Saxony